Hoya macrophylla is a species of flowering plant in the genus Hoya native to Borneo. The species has relatively large foliage for Hoyas, hence the species name meaning "large leaved", with characteristic veins.

References

macrophylla